Joseph Girard (August 2, 1853 – April 3, 1933) was a Canadian politician.

He was elected to the National Assembly of Quebec for Lac-Saint-Jean at the general elections of 1892 and re-elected in 1897. A Conservative, Girard was first elected in 1900 from the riding of Chicoutimi—Saguenay. He remained in parliament for seventeen years until his defeat in the Conscription crisis election of 1917 when he ran as a supporter of the Conservative-Unionist government's conscription policy.

References
 
 

1853 births
1933 deaths
Conservative Party of Canada (1867–1942) MPs
Members of the House of Commons of Canada from Quebec
Conservative Party of Quebec MNAs